Kennedy Odede is a Kenyan social entrepreneur and author of a New York Times best-selling memoir. Odede serves as co-founder and CEO of Shining Hope for Communities (SHOFCO), a grassroots movement based in Nairobi, Kenya and New York, USA. SHOFCO works in urban slums across Kenya, setting up and running a free school for girls in the slum, making clean water and medical care accessible, and helping individuals start small businesses. 

Odede was awarded the 2010 Echoing Green Fellowship, and was named to Forbes  under 30 list for top Social Entrepreneurs in 2014. He is also a member of the Clinton Global Initiative. His work has been featured by President Bill Clinton, Madonna, Beyonce, and on multiple occasions by Nicholas Kristof in The New York Times and his book A Path Appears. Odede’s own writing has appeared on the op-ed pages of The New York Times, CNN, Project Syndicate and The Guardian, among others. 

Odede is a Young Global Leader (YGL) at the World Economic Forum and an Obama Foundation Africa Leader. He is the co-author of the New York Times Bestselling book Find Me Unafraid: Love, Loss and Hope in African Slum, which he wrote with his wife and business partner, Jessica Posner.

Early life 

Odede was born in a small village in Kenya, where he lived until the village was struck by famine when he was two years old. His mother moved the family to the capital city, Nairobi, to seek better living conditions. Encountering a lack of jobs and housing in Nairobi, they ended up in Kibera. Odede lived in the Kibera Slum for 23 years and lived in extreme poverty. The oldest of eight children, Odede became a street-child at the age of ten. Influenced by the non-violence principles of Dr. Martin Luther King Jr., Odede imagined how he could change his community. In 2004, he had a job in a factory earning $1 for ten hours of work. He saved 20 cents and used this to buy a soccer ball and start SHOFCO. Shining Hope became the largest grassroots organization in Kibera. Although he was entirely informally educated, Odede received a full scholarship to Wesleyan University in America, becoming one of Kibera’s first to receive an education from an American liberal arts institution. He graduated in 2012 as the Commencement Speaker and with honors in sociology before returning full-time to SHOFCO.

Career 
SHOFCO is the largest grassroots organization in Kenya.  It started in Kibera and is now nationwide in more than 50+ communities. In 2010 Odede was awarded the Echoing Green Fellowship, which is given to the world’s best emerging social entrepreneurs. He was named to Forbes "30 under 30 list" for top Social Entrepreneurs and is a member of the Clinton Global Initiative. His work has been featured by President Bill Clinton, on NBC by Chelsea Clinton and Maria Menounos, and on multiple occasions by Nicholas Kristof in The New York Times. Odede previously served on the United Nations International Commission for Financing of Global Education Opportunities, and on the Board of Directors of Wesleyan University. He is a senior fellow with Humanity in Action and an Aspen Institute New Voices Fellow.  He was named a Schwab Foundation Social Entrepreneur of the year in 2022.  He is a Young Global Leader (YGL) of the World Economic Forum.  In 2022, He was appointed by Administrator Samantha Power to the USAID Advisory Committee.

Personal 
Odede is fluent in six languages - English, Swahili, Luo, Kikuyu, Kamba and Luhya. He graduated in 2012 as the Commencement Speaker and with honors in Sociology from Wesleyan University and served on the Wesleyan Board of Trustees. He is the co-author of a New York Times bestselling autobiography, Find Me Unafraid: Love, Loss, and Hope in an African Slum that is about him and his wife, Jessica Posner, and their collaboration. In August 2018, they had newborn twins: Oscar Garvey and Maridad Esther. In January 2020, their third child Zayn Nelson was born.

References

Year of birth missing (living people)
Living people
Kenyan emigrants to the United States
Social entrepreneurs
Wesleyan University alumni